This is the discography of the American hip-hop artist One Be Lo (aka OneManArmy). It also includes work with his groups Binary Star (with Senim Silla), Security (with Magestik Legend), and work from Subterraneous Records compilations.

One Be Lo

Albums

Official mixtapes

Singles

Binary Star

Albums

Singles

Subterraneous Records

Albums

Singles

Guest appearances

On albums

Note:
 * Includes an interlude featuring Binary Star at the end of the song.

On singles

Notes
 One Be Lo also goes by the aliases: OneManArmy, Rahlo, The Anonymous, BoyOneDa, Lofat, LoBeOne Kinobi, Teknik, Mr. Hide.
 "One Be Lo" is sometimes listed as: "One.Be.Lo" or "OneBeLo". "OneManArmy" is also occasionally listed as "One Man Army".

References

External links
 One Be Lo - Full Discography

Hip hop discographies
Discographies of American artists